The 1996 Cincinnati Bengals season was the franchise's 29th in professional football and its 27th with the National Football League. The Dave Shula era came to a sudden end when he was fired after a 1–6 start, as Jeff Blake struggled with turnovers. Former Bengals tight end Bruce Coslet, the team's offensive coordinator and a former New York Jets head coach, would replace Shula as head coach. The move paid off right away as the Bengals won the first three games under Coslet. After losing two of their next three games, the Bengals closed the year with three straight wins to finish with an 8–8 record. One bright spot was that wide receiver Carl Pickens became the first member of the Bengals to have 100 receptions in a season.

Offseason

NFL Draft

Undrafted free agents

Personnel

Staff

Roster

Regular season

Schedule

Standings

Team leaders

Passing

Rushing

Receiving

Defensive

Kicking and punting

Special teams

Awards and records 
 Carl Pickens, Franchise Record, Most Receptions in One Season, 100 Receptions 
 Carl Pickens, Led AFC, Receptions, 100 Receptions

Milestones 
 Carl Pickens, 3rd 1000 Yard Receiving Season, 1,180 yards

References

External links 
 
 1996 Cincinnati Bengals at Pro-Football-Reference.com

Cincinnati Bengals
Cincinnati Bengals seasons
Cincin